Flames of Desire (lit. Flames of Ambition) is a South Korean television series starring Shin Eun-kyung, Seo Woo, Yoo Seung-ho, Jo Min-ki, and Lee Soon-jae. It aired on MBC from October 2, 2010 to March 27, 2011 on Saturdays and Sundays at 21:45 for 50 episodes.

The early working title was A Woman Only Loves Once in a Lifetime.

Plot
The story of a conglomerate family that falls apart when the members are caught up in a furious battle for succession. Kim Tae-jin's children all covet his fortune and the power that he possesses as the company president, and they would do anything, however cruel and inhumane, to wrest it from the others. At the forefront of this desperate game is Yoon Na-young, the ruthless and ambitious wife of Kim Young-min, Tae-jin's third son. Her unquenchable thirst for power and wealth drove her to the point of no return, manipulating both husband and son to achieve her own desires.

Cast and characters
 Shin Eun-kyung as Yoon Na-young 
 Kim Yoo-jung as young Na-young
 She is a person who hides her evil intentions under her smiling face and have a chameleon sort of personality. Upon seeing how her mother lives her life by giving in, Na-young became more determined to live her life the way she wants. She is the type of person who strongly believes that you have to fight ruthlessly even for your own happiness and for that she made a decision that would later haunt her at her later part of her life. She didn't planned to have Soo-bin as her daughter-in-law in the path that she had paved for her son, Min-jae to walk on.
 Seo Woo as Baek Soo-bin / Baek In-ki
 Kim Yoo-jung as young Soo-bin
 She is the hidden daughter of Yoon Na-young who become one of the most famous movie actresses in the nation, thus earning herself the nickname of “Baek Inki” (translated as "Popular Baek"). But as many fans as she has, she has that much anti-fans as well. She is woman running towards success while running away from her past. She managed to marry Min-jae after they were caught in a scandalous position. The destruction of love and fame just seems like a game for her and she believes that winning it all will mean happiness for her.
 Yoo Seung-ho as Kim Min-jae
 Shin Dong-woo as young Min-jae 
 The 2nd generation son of a conglomerate family. He is someone with a pure soul. Whenever he feels lonely or is having a hard time, he has a habit of dancing off all his unhappiness and pain until he falls down. He is compassionate towards the woman that he loves despite her ugly past and will even give her a warm hug when she needs it. As the owner of his own fate, he doesn't have to change the way he is even if the secret of his birth is disclosed.
 Jo Min-ki as Kim Young-min
 Joo Han-ha as young Young-min 
 The first generation son of a conglomerate family, he is the third son of Kim Tae-jin. His sole wish is to become a college professor but it changed the moment he entered a family-arranged marriage with Yoon Na-young. Although he has the power to oppose his father and live the life he wants, he chose not to leave. Unlike his ambitious wife Na-young, Young-min is a kindhearted man and father who believes that the family must stay united to be strong. Unlike his siblings, he has a deeper understanding and compassion for others, but he finds himself destroyed when the secret of his son's real birthright is revealed.
 Lee Soon-jae as Chairman Kim Tae-jin - He is a self-made tycoon who built his business empire from scratch. A strong charismatic father with three sons and a daughter. The K group Enterprise's Company president finds himself facing another challenge in life as his children fight to become his empire's successor, with the most aggressive person being Yoon Na-young, the wife of his third son who will stop at nothing to push her husband and son to the top of his succession list.

Kim family
 Lee Hyo-choon as Kang Geum-hwa
 Kim Byung-ki as Kim Young-dae
 Lee Bo-hee as Cha Soon-ja
 Jo Sung-ha as Kim Young-joon
 Sung Hyun-ah as Nam Ae-ri
 Son Eun-seo as Kim Mi-jin
 Kim Seung-hyun as Kim Young-shik
 Baek Jong-min as Kim Sung-jae

Yoon family
 Lee Ho-jae as Yoon Sang-hoon
 Kim Hee-jung as Yoon Jung-sook
 Cho Jin-woong as Kang Joon-goo

Extended cast
 Lee Se-chang as Park Duk-sung
 Uhm Soo-jung as Yang In-sook
 Park Chan-hwan as Song Jin-ho
 Kim Sung-hoon as loan shark
 Jeon Se-hong as Jin-sook

Awards and nominations

References

External links
Flames of Desire official MBC website 
Flames of Desire at MBC Global Media

MBC TV television dramas
2010 South Korean television series debuts
2011 South Korean television series endings
Korean-language television shows
South Korean melodrama television series